Vice-Admiral Sir Francis Murray Austin, KBE, CB (10 September 1881 – 19 June 1953) was a Royal Navy officer who served in both world wars.

On the outbreak of the Second World War in 1939, Austin returned to active service as a commodore in the Royal Naval Reserve. He served continuously as a convoy commodore for three years and was appointed KBE in 1942 for his service.

References 

 http://www.dreadnoughtproject.org/tfs/index.php/Francis_Murray_Austin
 https://www.ukwhoswho.com/view/10.1093/ww/9780199540891.001.0001/ww-9780199540884-e-234247

1881 births
1953 deaths
Royal Navy vice admirals
Knights Commander of the Order of the British Empire
Companions of the Order of the Bath